Push is the debut album by British pop band Bros and was released on 28 March 1988 on CBS. The album peaked at number two in the UK Albums Chart and was certified quadruple platinum in the UK. It was also a worldwide success, reaching number one in New Zealand, and the top ten in Australia and several countries in Europe.

In late 2013, a 25th anniversary 3-CD remastered and expanded edition of Push was released on the Cherry Pop record label, a subsidiary of Cherry Red Records. The song "Silent Night", originally released as a double A-side single with "Cat Among the Pigeons", was included on the expanded edition, as well as B-sides and remixes from the five singles that were released from the album.

Writing and composition
All the songs were written by Nicky Graham and Bros' manager Tom Watkins, with Graham composing the music and Watkins writing the lyrics. The pair used the pseudonym "The Brothers" in order to imply that the songs had been written by the Goss twins, and that the group was not simply a manufactured pop outfit. In his autobiography Watkins described how he had deliberately come up with song titles and lyrics that the teen market could identify with, such as "Drop the Boy" being about a youth asking to be treated as an adult. Other themes included childhood poverty ("Ten Out of Ten"), the then-current AIDS epidemic ("Shocked"), and past relationships ("I Owe You Nothing"). One of the album's more serious lyrical subjects was the closing ballad "Cat Among the Pigeons", which Watkins stated was about a friend who had struggled to cope with the early death of their father, and as a result had embarked on tempestuous and doomed relationships. Watkins also admitted that his original, more explicit lyric for "When Will I Be Famous?", a song that had been created for his own short-lived band the Hudsons, had been written as a conversation between two gay men: a young man desperate for fame and attention, and an older, more experienced man giving his advice. When he and Graham decided to give the song to Bros to record, Watkins toned down the lyrics and removed the references to homosexuality.

Graham composed the music using some basic equipment at his home in Wimbledon in south-west London, before taking the songs to his Hot Nights studio a short distance away in Fulham. There he played all the instruments and programmed all the keyboards, before inviting the group to the studio to learn their parts and record Matt Goss' vocals.

Talking to Smash Hits in April 1988, Matt Goss explained why the album was titled Push: "Well, when we were in the studio recording it, if one of us was really, like, going for it we'd say, 'Right man, that's really pushing it.' It's a word we all latched on to, and Nicky latched on to it too. We'd all be going, 'Is that pushing it? Yeah, that's push.' So the album couldn't really be called anything else."

Critical reception

Reviews of Push in the UK music press were mixed. In Melody Maker Jonh Wilde described the album as "ten songs that are entirely modern in an entirely charmless way", and called it "sad and useless" and "mediocrity's snowy mountain-top". However, Tim Nicholson of Record Mirror stated that "Push is perfectly crafted pop oozing pre-sex appeal".

In a retrospective review for AllMusic, Brendan Swift highlighted "When Will I Be Famous?" and "I Owe You Nothing" as good examples of 1980s pop music, and that while the album contained few low points it also lacked depth, commenting that "Push makes for far better dancing than listening".

Chart performance
In the UK Albums Chart, Push was kept off the number one spot by the compilation album Now 11 for two weeks, and then by Tracy Chapman's self-titled album for a week, although Push went on to sell more copies than both albums in 1988 and ranked as the fourth best-selling album for that year in the UK.

Track listing 
All tracks written by The Brothers (a pseudonym for Nicky Graham and Tom Watkins).

Personnel 

Bros
Matt Goss – vocals
Luke Goss – drums
Craig Logan – bass

Additional personnel
Nicky Graham – keyboards, programming and arranging
Pete Glenister – guitars
Andy Richards – Fairlight Series III
Jimmie Gallagher – saxophones
Helena Springs – backing vocals
Dee Lewis – backing vocals
Shirley Lewis – backing vocals

Production
 Mixed and produced by Nicky Graham
 Engineered by Christopher Marc Potter
 Assisted by Alex Osman, Richard Edwards
 Designed by Three Associates
 Photography by Neil Matthews

Charts

Weekly charts

Year-end charts

Certifications

Release history

References

1988 debut albums
Bros (British band) albums